Several municipalities in the Canadian province of Quebec held municipal elections on November 6, 1983, to elect mayors and councillors.

Results

Gatineau

Source: Jack Aubry, "Ex-mayor's 'victory' short-lived," Ottawa Citizen, 2 November 1987, A1.

 
1983